Lilianae (also known as Liliiflorae) is a botanical name for a superorder (that is, a rank higher than that of order) of flowering plants. Such a superorder of necessity includes the type family Liliaceae (and usually the type order Liliales). Terminations at the rank of superorder are not standardized by the International Code of Nomenclature for algae, fungi, and plants (ICN), although the suffix -anae has been proposed.

Lilianae, introduced in 1966 as a name for a superorder, progressively replaced the older term Liliiflorae, introduced in 1825 as a name for an order.

Taxonomy

History

Early history - Liliiflorae 

Liliiflorae was a term introduced by Carl Adolph Agardh in 1825 as a higher order to include the Liliaceae (which he called Coronariae) and related families. Argadh, together with De Candolle developed the concept of ordered botanical ranks, in this case grouping together De Jussieu's (1789) recently defined collections of genera (families) into higher order groupings (orders). However, at the time what are now known as families were referred to by the term ordo, and in Argadh's nomenclature these were grouped into classes.

While De Jussieu placed the type family or ordo, Lilia together with seven other ordines in the Classis, Stamina Perigyna of the Monocotyledones (monocots), de Candolle, who called the type family Liliacées in French, considered them to belong within those vascular plants (Vasculares) whose vascular bundles were thought to arise from within (Endogènes, endogenous), a term he preferred to Monocotylédonés. Jussieu's Monocotyledones thus became the Phanérogames, meaning "visible seed", hence Endogenæ phanerogamæ. De Candolle's Phanérogames thus defined included 22 familles. By contrast, Argadh's more specific grouping of classis Liliiflorae contained only ten families, and positioned the Liliiflorae within a larger grouping, the Cryptocotyledoneae (i.e. Endogènes).

A number of different terms were used successively to group together Liliaceae and related families, including Liliales (Lindley, 1853), Coronariae (Bentham and Hooker, 1883) and Liliinées (Van Tieghem, 1891), till Engler (1892) reintroduced Liliiflorae as a Reihe (order). This form of classification was continued by Wettstein (1901–1908) and Lotsy (1907–1911). A number of other authors preferred Liliales, including Warming (1912) and Bessey (1915), although Hallier (1912) preferred Liliiflorae. These were all essentially orders, groupings of families within the monocotyledons, with a few exceptions. Calestani (1933) created series, in three groupings with Liliaceae in one of three series making up Liranthae, while Hutchinson (1934, 1959) called these divisions, placing Liliaceae in the order Liliales, and division Corolliferae. In 1956 Kimura, in a many layered scheme, placed Liliaceae within the order Liliales as part of Liliiflorae, similarly Emberger's (1960) Liliiflores, although Melchior (1964) returned Liliiflorae to the rank of order. Very few of these classifications had much in common, other than nomenclature, being based on very different concepts of connections between characteristics.

Superorder Lilianae 

The late 1960s saw a marked shift in the taxonomic treatment of this group, with the publication of four systems that would remain influential for the best part of the century, and which predominantly used the concept of superorder. These were the systems of Armen Takhtajan (1910–2009), Arthur Cronquist (1919–1992), Robert Thorne (1920–2015) and Rolf Dahlgren (1932–1987). In 1964 Zabinkova proposed formal rules for naming taxa above the rank of order, where superorders would end with the suffix -anae. In the same issue of Taxon Takhtajan utilised those suggested rules to outline a coherent hierarchical supraordinal classification, as follows.

Subdivisio Magnolicae (Angiospermae)
 Classis Magnoliatae (Dicotyledones)
 Classis Liliatae (Monocotyledones)
 Subclassis Alismatidae
 Subclassis Liliidae
 Superordo Lilianae
 Ordo Liliales
 Ordo Bromeliales
 Ordo Iridales
 Ordo Dioscoreales
 Ordo Zingiberales
 Ordo Haemodorales
 Ordo Orchidales
 Superordo Juncanae
 Subclassis Commelinidae
 Subclassis Arecidae

This was the first use of the term Lilianae by him, but was not formally described and hence attributed (superordo nov.) till 1966, when he published a formal monograph (in Russian, English translation available 1969) on the classification of the flowering plants. He considered Lilianae a synonym of Liliiforae. At the same time Cronquist and Takhtajan, who had worked closely together, jointly published a formal proposal in English for the nomenclature and classification of the supraordinal taxa, to the level of class. 

In that system, which differed only in minor detail from 1964 (which see) he placed Lilianae together with Juncanae as superorders of the subclass Liliidae, one of four in class Liliatae (i.e. Monocotyledones). Although its composition changed over time, Takhtajan continued its basic structure through to his last work in 2009, in which the Lilianae is one of four superorders of Lillidae. Cronquist developed his system in a rather different way, producing his first overall classification in 1968 (revised 1988), based on subclasses, but not superorders. This placed two orders, Liliales and Orchidales into the subclass Liliidae, and did not contain the Lilianae.

By contrast Thorne, who produced his system in 1968, created five superorders amongst the monocotyledons, but called the superorder corresponding to Lilianae, by the older name of Liliiflorae, with only one order, Liliales. Thorne produced many revisions of his original scheme but in 1992 he decided to follow the practice of his contemporaries (Takhtajan, Cronquist and the Dahlgrens) and abandon the use of Liliiflorae (since the suffix only applied to angiosperms) and adopt Lilianae. In this version Lilianae was one of nine superorders within subclass Liliidae (monocotyledons) and contained five orders, Liliales, Burmanniales, Asparagales, Dioscoreales, and Orchidales. Huber's study of the seed-coat characteristics of Liliiflorae (Liliifloren) in 1969, and his integration of these with other evidence resulted in a radically novel taxonomy for this group. His much narrower conception of families, was an important stepping stone towards the modern family structure.

Rolf Dahlgren, who followed Huber's concepts on structure, had followed Takhtajan in using the term Lilianae in his 1977 classification although many of his contemporaries continued to use the older Liliiflorae. Clifford provides a comparison between Takhtajan and the Cronquist system at that time. Later, in 1980 Dahlgren reverted to Liliiflorae, explaining he was following the example of Robert Thorne (1968, 1976) since this had precedence over Cronquist (1968) and Takhtajan (1969). In his subsequent books on the monocotyledons, only Liliiflorae was used. Following Rolf Dahlgren's death in 1987 his wife, Gertrud Dahlgren, continued their work and published a further revision in 1989 that reverted to Lilianae.

Dahlgren's final work (1985), whose family structure was the basis for the modern system, placed Liliiflorae as one of ten superorders within the monocotyledons, and containing five orders;
 Dioscoreales
 Asparagales
 Melanthiales
 Burmanniales
 Liliales

with Gertrud Dahlgren subsequently separating off the Orchidales from Liliales in 1989.

Thorne issued successive versions of his scheme  but in the second of his 1992 revisions he also reverted to the use of the suffix -anae over -florae for superorders, like Dahlgren mistakenly believing that Cronquist had used the term (see note above). Following Dahlgren et al.'''s The families of the monocotyledons (1985) the next major monograph on the flowering plants was Kubitzki and Huber's The families and genera of vascular plants'' (1998), which also used Lilanae as a superorder. These systems usually placed Lilianae within subclass Liliidae of class Liliopsida.

In addition to these systems of plant taxonomy that recognise a superorder Lilianae (Liliiflorae) are the Reveal system and the Angiosperm Phylogeny Group (APG). In the latter system, the Lilianae are also referred to as the informal unranked clade monocots.

Phylogeny

See also 
 List of systems of plant taxonomy

Notes

References

Bibliography

Books and symposia 
 
 
 
 
  Also available as pdf document

Historical sources 
 
 
 
 
 
 
 
 
 
 
 
 
 
 
  Volume 1: Monocotyledonae 1926, Volume 2:Dicotyledonae 1934.

Chapters

Articles

Other 
 
 
 

Eukaryote superorders
Monocots